"The Saint" is a theme tune for The Saint composed first as a whistled melody by author Leslie Charteris himself, before being expanded by Edwin Astley 1962, and later Brian Dee, Irving Martin, and Orbital in television and film versions.

Orbital version

English electronic music duo Orbital covered "The Saint" and released it as a single in April 1997. It is taken from the soundtrack to the film of the same name. The track is an updated version of Edwin Astley's theme music from the 1960s TV series The Saint and plays over a scene towards the end of the film. The single's B-side, "The Sinner", is an original composition developing elements of Orbital's arrangement from the A-side.

"The Saint" was one of Orbital's biggest hit singles. It reached number three in Iceland and on the UK Singles Chart, their highest-placing song on that chart along with "Satan Live". In Ireland it peaked at number seven, and in Finland it reached number eight. The single also sold well in North America, making it to number 15 on the Canadian Singles Chart and number four on the US Billboard Bubbling Under Hot 100. Despite its success, it is not included on any of Orbital's retrospective albums, though it did appear on some reissues of their 1996 album In Sides. It was included in Orbital's live set during Lollapalooza 1997 and that year's Phoenix Festival but has not been played live since.

Charts

Weekly charts

Year-end charts

Release history

Other versions
The Les Reed Brass – 1962
Laurel Aitken – 1963
The Eliminators – 1966
Roland Shaw And His Orchestra – 1966

References

External links
 Official Orbital website

1962 songs
1997 singles
FFRR Records singles
Orbital (band) songs
The Saint (Simon Templar)
Television drama theme songs